The Lions of Lucerne is a 2002 spy novel by Brad Thor.

Thor's first novel with the character of Scot Harvath, an ex-Navy SEAL and current U.S. Secret Service agent, The Lions of Lucerne relates how Harvath survives an attack which leaves 30 of his fellow agents dead and the president of the United States kidnapped. Harvath then begins a search for those responsible and attempts to rescue the president.

Reviews
Reviews for the book were mixed. Publishing industry trade magazines were generally negative. Publishers Weekly wrote "it's hard to get past the novel's many graceless shortcomings, clichéd language [...], cartoonish scenes and a protagonist whose superhero character desperately needs fleshing out." A reviewer for Kirkus Reviews called Thor's prose "tangled" at times. Library Journal, however, highly recommended the novel, calling it "an assured debut" and concluding that "this international thriller will delight readers with its nonstop action, relentless suspense, strong protagonist, and wintry settings in Utah, D.C., and Switzerland. Well researched, high-voltage entertainment reminiscent of Robert Ludlum and David Morrell [...]."

Other media, notably regional titles, were just as positive. The Anniston Star wrote that Thor had recreated "a genre that has been firmly in the grasp of Tom Clancy for so long is not an easy feat. Fortunately for military intrigue devotees, Brad Thor has done just that — and on his first time out too." The Tacoma Reporter wrote "this book is one of the best entries into the military thriller genre since the early works of Tom Clancy" and that Harvath "will definitely take a place beside Cussler's Dirk Pitt and Clancy's Jack Ryan."

Named one of the 10 of The Best Political Thrillers Ever by Barnes and Noble

References

External links
 Author Brad Thor's Website
 Behind the Book Video

American spy novels
2002 American novels
2002 debut novels